Elections to Moyle District Council were held on 5 May 2005 on the same day as the other Northern Irish local government elections. The election used three district electoral areas to elect a total of 15 councillors.

Election results

Note: "Votes" are the first preference votes.

Districts summary

|- class="unsortable" align="centre"
!rowspan=2 align="left"|Ward
! % 
!Cllrs
! % 
!Cllrs
! %
!Cllrs
! %
!Cllrs
! % 
!Cllrs
!rowspan=2|TotalCllrs
|- class="unsortable" align="center"
!colspan=2 bgcolor="" | Sinn Féin
!colspan=2 bgcolor="" | SDLP
!colspan=2 bgcolor="" | UUP
!colspan=2 bgcolor="" | DUP
!colspan=2 bgcolor="white"| Others
|-
|align="left"|Ballycastle
|bgcolor="#008800"|35.0
|bgcolor="#008800"|2
|26.6
|1
|13.5
|1
|12.4
|0
|12.5
|1
|5
|-
|align="left"|Giant's Causeway
|0.0
|0
|0.0
|0
|29.4
|2
|bgcolor="#D46A4C"|56.2
|bgcolor="#D46A4C"|2
|14.4
|1
|5
|-
|align="left"|The Glens
|bgcolor="#008800"|47.2
|bgcolor="#008800"|2
|29.4
|2
|0.0
|0
|7.8
|0
|15.6
|1
|5
|-'
|-
|- class="unsortable" class="sortbottom" style="background:#C9C9C9"
|align="left"| Total
|30.4
|4
|21.0
|3
|12.4
|3
|21.9
|2
|14.3
|3
|15
|-
|}

Districts results

Ballycastle

2001: 2 x SDLP, 1 x UUP, 1 x DUP, 1 x Independent
2005: 2 x Sinn Féin, 1 x SDLP, 1 x UUP, 1 x Independent
2001-2005 Change: Sinn Féin (two seats) gain from SDLP and DUP

Giant's Causeway

2001: 2 x DUP, 2 x UUP, 1 x Independent
2005: 2 x DUP, 2 x UUP, 1 x Independent
2001-2005 Change: No change

The Glens

2001: 2 x SDLP, 2 x Independent, 1 x Sinn Féin
2005: 2 x Sinn Féin, 2 x SDLP, 1 x Independent
2001-2005 Change: Independent joins Sinn Féin

References

Moyle District Council elections
Moyle